Doctor Wislizenus is a 1924 German silent film directed by Hanns Kobe and starring Charlotte Ander, Fritz Kortner and Jakob Tiedtke.

The film's sets were designed by the art director Robert A. Dietrich.

Cast
In alphabetical order
 Charlotte Ander as Lena 
 Siegfried Berisch as Milbe 
 Paul Bildt as Dichter Wohlgetan 
 Paul Graetz as Iltis 
 Fritz Kortner as Dr. Wislizenus 
 Marija Leiko
 Leon Richter as Engerling 
 Joachim Ringelnatz as Alte Frau 
 Jakob Tiedtke as Wirt

References

Bibliography
 Hans-Michael Bock and Tim Bergfelder. The Concise Cinegraph: An Encyclopedia of German Cinema. Berghahn Books, 2009.

External links

1924 films
Films of the Weimar Republic
Films directed by Hanns Kobe
German silent feature films
German black-and-white films